The 1931 Syracuse Orangemen football team represented Syracuse University in the 1931 college football season. The Orangemen were led by second-year head coach Vic Hanson and played their home games at Archbold Stadium in Syracuse, New York.

Schedule

References

Syracuse
Syracuse Orange football seasons
Syracuse Orangemen football